The 1944 College Football All-America team is composed of college football players who were selected as All-Americans by various organizations and writers that chose College Football All-America Teams in 1944. The nine selectors recognized by the NCAA as "official" for the 1944 season are (1) Collier's Weekly, as selected by Grantland Rice, (2) the Associated Press, (3) the United Press, (4) the All-America Board, (5) Football News, (6) the International News Service (INS), (7) Look magazine, (8) the Newspaper Enterprise Association (NEA) and (9) the Sporting News.

Ohio State quarterback Les Horvath and Navy tackle Don Whitmire were the only players unanimously chosen as first-team player by all of the official selectors. Horvath won the 1944 Heisman Trophy as the Buckeyes turned in a 9–0 record and finished second in the national polls. Whitmire later served in Vietnam and held the rank of rear admiral.

Georgia Tech end Phil Tinsley received first-team honors from eight of the nine official selectors, and Army backfield duo of Glenn Davis and Doc Blanchard each received seven first-team honors.

Consensus All-Americans
For the year 1944, the NCAA recognizes nine published All-American teams as "official" designations for purposes of its consensus determinations. The following chart identifies the NCAA-recognized consensus All-Americans and displays which first-team designations they received.

All-American selections for 1944

Ends
 Phil Tinsley, Georgia Tech (AAB; AP-1; COL; FN; FWAA-2; INS-1; LK; NEA; SN; UP-2; CP-1; WC)
 Paul Walker, Yale (COL; FN; FWAA-1; INS-2; LK; NEA; UP-2; CP-1)
 Jack Dugger, Ohio State (AAB; AP-3; FWAA-1; INS-1; SN; UP-1; CP-2; WC)
 Hub Bechtol, Texas (College Football Hall of Fame) (AP-1)
 Henry Walker, Virginia (AP-2)
 Leon Bramlett, Navy(AP-2)
 Barney Poole, Army (College Football Hall of Fame) (AP-3; UP-1; INS-2; CP-2)
 Frank Bauman, Purdue (UP-3; FWAA-2)
 Ben Martin, Navy (UP-3)
 Art Renner, Michigan (UP-4)

Tackles
 Don Whitmire, Navy (College Football Hall of Fame) (AAB; AP-1; COL; FN; FWAA-1; INS-1; LK; NEA; SN; UP-1; CP-1; WC)
 John Ferraro, USC (College Football Hall of Fame) (AAB; AP-1; COL; FN; FWAA-1; INS-1; NEA [g]; UP-2; CP-1; WC)
 George Savitsky, Penn (College Football Hall of Fame) (NEA; UP-3)
 Bill Willis, Ohio State (College and Pro Football Hall of Fame) (AP-2; FWAA-2; INS-2; LK; SN; UP-1)
 Milan Lazetich, Michigan (AP-2; FWAA-2; INS-2; UP-3; CP-2)
 Monte Moncrief, Texas A&M (AP-3)
 Robert McClure, Nevada (AP-3; UP-4)
 DeWitt "Tex" Coulter, Army (UP-2)
 George Owen, Wake Forest (UP-4)
 George Sullivan, Notre Dame (UP-4; CP-2)

Guards
 Bill Hackett, Ohio State (AAB; AP-1; COL; FN; FWAA-1; INS-2; UP-2; CP-1; WC)
 Ben Chase, Navy (AAB; FN; FWAA-2; INS-1; SN; UP-1; CP-1; WC)
 Hamilton Nichols, Rice (AP-1)
 Joe Stanowicz, Army (FWAA-1; INS-1; UP-1; CP-2)
 Clyde Flowers, TCU (NEA)
 John Green, Army (College Football Hall of Fame) (AP-2; COL; INS-2)
 William Hachten, California (AP-2; UP-4; LK)
 Ralph Serpico, Illinois (AP-3; SN; UP-3; FWAA-2)
 Robert Dobelstein, Tennessee (AP-3)
 Pat Filley, Notre Dame (UP-2)
 Ellis Jones, Tulsa (UP-3; CP-2; LK)
 Ernie Knotts, Duke (UP-4)

Centers
 John Tavener, Indiana (College Football Hall of Fame) (UP-1; FWAA-1; INS-1; LK; CP-1)
 Caleb Warrington, Auburn (AAB; AP-1; COL; FWAA-2; INS-2; NEA; SN; UP-3; WC)
 Felto Prewitt, Tulsa (AP-2; FN)
 Robert St. Onge, Army (AP-3)
 John T. Martin, Navy (UP-2)
 Gordon Appleby, Ohio State (UP-4)
 Gordon Berlin, Washington (CP-2)

Quarterbacks
 Les Horvath, Ohio State (College Football Hall of Fame) (AAB; AP-1; COL [fb]; FN; FWAA-1; INS-1; LK; NEA; SN; UP-1; CP-1; WC)
 Buddy Young, Illinois (College Football Hall of Fame) (AP-2; UP-2; INS-2; CP-2; LK)
 Doug Kenna, Army (College Football Hall of Fame) (UP-3; COL; CP-2)
 Jim Hardy, USC (UP-4; FWAA-2)
 Frank Broyles, Georgia Tech (FWAA-2)

Halfbacks
 Glenn Davis, Army (College Football Hall of Fame) (AAB; AP-1; FN; FWAA-1; INS-1; NEA; SN; UP-1; CP-1; WC)
Creighton Miller, Notre Dame (College Football Hall of Fame) (CO-1; FN; INS-1; SN)
 Bob Jenkins, Navy (AAB; AP-2; COL; FWAA-2; INS-2; NEA; SN; UP-1; WC)
 Bob Odell, Penn (College Football Hall of Fame) (CO-1; INS-1; LK; NYS-1)
 Bob Fenimore, Oklahoma A&M (College Football Hall of Fame) (AP-1; COL; FN; FWAA-1; INS-2; NEA; UP-3; CP-2)
 Jug Girard, Wisconsin (LK)
 Bob Kelly , Notre Dame (AP-3; UP-2; INS-2)
 Shorty McWilliams, Mississippi State (AP-2; UP-2)
 Thomas Davis, Duke (AP-3; UP-4; CP-2)
 Harold Hamburg, Navy (AP-3; UP-3)
 Clyde Scott, Navy (College Football Hall of Fame) (UP-4)

Fullbacks
 Doc Blanchard, Army (College Football Hall of Fame) (AAB; AP-1; FN; FWAA-1; INS-1; LK; SN; UP-1; CP-1; WC)
 Babe Dimancheff, Purdue (AP-2; UP-2; FWAA-2; INS-1; CP-1)
 Bob Wiese, Michigan/Navy (UP-3)
 Gordon Gray, USC (AP-3; UP-4)

Key
Bold = Consensus All-American
 -1 – First-team selection
 -2 – Second-team selection
 -3 – Third-team selection

Official selectors
 AAB = All-America Board
 AP = Associated Press
 COL = Collier's Weekly: "chosen by Grantland Rice and 10 veteran football writers from all sections of the country"
 FN = Football News
 INS = International News Service
 LK = Look magazine, selected by NBC sports reporter and commentator Bill Stern
 NEA = Newspaper Enterprise Association: "It still is the duty of every football writer, it seems,  to pick an All-America team. Selecting one has become a futility that even a World War can't stop. So without further ado and with no apologies, here we go again."
 SN = Sporting News
 UP = United Press: "selected for the United Press ... by sports editors and writers from all over the country"

Other selectors
 CP = Central Press Association: "Mighty Army, Navy, and Ohio State dominated the 1944 Central Press Captains' All-American team, picked for the 14th straight season with the help of the nation's football captains. As in the past two years, service players are not included in the selections."
 FWAA = Football Writers Association of America
 WC = Walter Camp Football Foundation

See also
 1944 All-Big Six Conference football team
 1944 All-Big Ten Conference football team
 1944 All-Pacific Coast Conference football team
 1944 All-SEC football team

References

All-America Team
College Football All-America Teams